Ocllo may refer to:
Mama Ocllo, the fertility goddess in Inca religion
Palla Chimpu Ocllo (Isabel Suárez Chimpu Ocllo), an Inca princess
475 Ocllo, a small asteroid